The 2015 Aviva Women's Tour was the second staging of The Women's Tour, a women's stage race held in the United Kingdom. It ran from 17 to 21 June 2015 and had a UCI rating of 2.1. As in 2014, the race consisted of 5 stages and ran through southern and eastern England. The defending champion, Marianne Vos, was unable to participate due to injury. The winner of the first stage, Lizzie Armitstead, was unable to participate further in the race after she crashed crossing the finishing line, sustaining a sprained wrist and heavy bruising. Lisa Brennauer assumed the race lead after Armitstead's withdrawal, and after briefly losing the lead to Christine Majerus on stage three, her stage win on the fourth stage allowed her to reassume the race lead which she held to the end of the race.

Teams
UCI Women's teams

Non-UCI women's teams
Pearl Izumi Sports Tours International
National teams
Germany
United States

Jerseys
 denotes the leader of the General classification, the rider with the overall lowest cumulative time
 denotes the leader of the Mountains classification
 denotes the leader of the Points classification
 denotes the leader of the Young rider classification, the rider with the lowest cumulative time who is also under 23 years.
 denotes the leader of the Best British rider classification, which is the British rider with the lowest cumulative time

Stages

Stage 1
17 June 2015 — Bury St Edmunds to Aldeburgh,

Stage 2
18 June 2015 — Braintree to Clacton-on-Sea,

Stage 3
19 June 2015 — Oundle to Kettering,

Stage 4
20 June 2015 — Waltham Cross to Stevenage,

Stage 5
21 June 2015 — Marlow to Hemel Hempstead,

See also
 2015 in women's road cycling

References

External links

The Women's Tour
2015 in British women's sport
The Women's Tour